Volucribacter is a genus of bacteria from the class of Pasteurellaceae. Volucribacter are pathogens in birds.

References

Further reading 
 

Pasteurellales
Bacteria genera
Bird diseases